Lissozodes basalis is a species of beetle in the family Cerambycidae, the only species in the genus Lissozodes.

References

Necydalopsini
Monotypic beetle genera